Ouanda Djallé Airport  is an airstrip serving Ouanda Djallé, a village in the Vakaga prefecture of the Central African Republic. The airstrip lies alongside the RN5 road that runs northwest out of the village.

See also

Transport in the Central African Republic
List of airports in the Central African Republic

References

External links 
OpenStreetMap - Ouanda Djallé
OurAirports - Ouanda Djallé

Airports in the Central African Republic
Buildings and structures in Vakaga